Irakli Abashidze Street is a street of Tbilisi and is named after the Georgian writer Irakli Abashidze. The street is located on the right bank of the Kura River in the Vake district of Tbilisi, from the round garden to Archil Mishveladze Street.  The section of Vasil Barnov Street was named after Irakli Abashidze in 1992 (he lived on this street).  At the beginning of the street there is a bust of Irakli Abashidze (sculptor K. Arunashvili, architect Giorgi (Giga) Batiashvili).

Bibliography
 "Tbilisi. Streets, avenues, squares" (ენციკლოპედია «თბილისი. ქუჩები, გამზირები, მოედნები»), pg.11 , Tbilisi, 2008.

References

External links

Streets in Tbilisi
Vake District
Vake, Tbilisi